Posyolok Gospitomnika is a rural locality (a settlement) in Selo Yenotayevka of Yenotayevsky District, Astrakhan Oblast, Russia. The population was 20 as of 2010.

References 

Rural localities in Yenotayevsky District